Kenyan–Kosovan relations are foreign relations between Kenya and Kosovo. Formal diplomatic relations between two states are non-existent as Kenya does not recognize Kosovo as a sovereign state.

History 

At a meeting on 30 July 2008 between Kenyan and Serbian Foreign Ministers, Moses Wetangula and Vuk Jeremić, Wetangula reportedly spoke of Kenya's principled position regarding Kosovo and the territorial integrity of Serbia.

Following a September 2010 meeting with Kenyan politicians, Albanian prime minister Sali Berisha said that Kenya had promised to decide positively regarding recognition of Kosovo.

In October 2012, Kosovar sources reported that Kenyan Prime Minister of Kenya, Raila Odinga, stated that Kenya was seriously considering recognising Kosovo, and that a decision would be announced shortly.

See also 

 Foreign relations of Kenya
 Foreign relations of Kosovo

Notes

References 

Kosovo
Kenya